Gheorghe Vodă (December 24, 1934 in Văleni – February 24, 2007 in Chişinău) was a writer, screenwriter and film director from Moldova.

Among the participants of the funeral of the late Gheorghe Vodă were Arcadie Suceveanu, vice president Moldovan Writers' Union, Ion Ungureanu, Vladimir Beşleagă, Anatol Codru, Andrei Vartic, Andrei Strâmbeanu, Mihai Poiată.

Biography
Gheorghe Vodă was born on December 24, 1934, in the village of Văleni, Ismail County (now Cahul district). He studied Philology at the "Ion Creangă" Pedagogical University in Chișinău (1954-1959), and then higher courses of director and scriptwriter at the Gerasimov Institute of Cinematography from Moscow (1964-1966).

After graduating from the faculty, he worked as a journalist and poet. His first volumes of poetry (Flight of seeds, 1962; Autumn Fire, 1965; Hot Rain, 1967; Wings for Manole, 1969) enclose in the resurrectional context of the Bessarabian sixteenth writers, who made the effort to remove the literature from the ideological schemes of time and to impress an aesthetic and national consciousness.

Death and funeral
Gheorghe Vodă died on February 24, 2007, in Chișinău, being buried in the Central Cemetery in Chișinău. He was led on the last road by Bessarabian culture personalities such as: Arcadie Suceveanu, the vice-president of the Moldovan Writers' Union, the former minister of culture Ion Ungureanu, writers Vladimir Beşleagă, Anatol Codru, Andrei Vartic, Andrei Strâmbeanu, Mihai Poiată and others.

Awards
 The Grand Prize for documentary film at the Regional Film Festival in Chişinău (1967) for the film De-ale toamnei; 
 Special Jury Prize for Best Comedy and Special Prize for Best Screenplay at the Riga Regional Film Festival (1968, 8th edition) for the film Se caută un paznic.

Works
 Zborul seminţelor (1962)
 Focuri de toamnă (1965)
 Ploaie fierbinte (1967)
 Aripi pentru Manole (1969)
 Pomii dulci (1972)
 Inima alergând (1981)
 De dorul vieţii, de dragul pământului (1983)
 Valurile (1984)
 La capătul vederii (1984)
 Viaţa pe nemâncate (1999)

Filmography

Director

Drama
 Bariera (s/m, 1965)
 Se caută un paznic (1967)
 Singur în faţa dragostei (1969)
 Vara ostaşului Dedov (1971)

Documentary Films
 Amar (1965)
 Chişinău-500 (1966)
 Cu cântecul în ospeţie (1966)
 De-ale toamnei (1966)
 Maria (1969)
 Chişinău, Chişinău (1971)
 Încredere  (1973)
 Vară de neuitat (1974)
 Usturici nr.3 (1989)

Scenarist
 Familia noastră  (1962)
 Amar (1965)
 Bariera (s/m, 1965)
 Singur în faţa dragostei (1969)
 Maria (1969)
 Maturitate (1973)
 Încredere  (1973)
 Vară de neuitat (1974)
 Usturici nr.12 (1975)
 Jumătate de regat pentru un cal (1983)

References

Bibliography 
 Literatura şi arta Moldovei Encicl. - Vol. 1 - Chişinău, 1985
 Chisinau-enciclopedie, 1997

External links 
 Web-enciclopedia filmului moldovenesc - Gheorghe Voda
 Gheorghe Vodă

1934 births
2007 deaths
People from Cahul District
Eastern Orthodox Christians from Moldova
Moldovan writers
Moldovan male writers
Romanian writers
Moldovan documentary filmmakers
Moldovan film directors
Moldovan screenwriters
Moldova State University alumni
20th-century screenwriters